Omar Jalil Flores Majul (born 11 September 1975) is a Mexican politician from the Institutional Revolutionary Party. In 2012 he served as Deputy of the LXI Legislature of the Mexican Congress representing Guerrero.

References

1975 births
Living people
Politicians from Guerrero
People from Taxco
Institutional Revolutionary Party politicians
21st-century Mexican politicians
Deputies of the LXI Legislature of Mexico
Members of the Chamber of Deputies (Mexico) for Guerrero